Dow Henry Finsterwald, Sr. (September 6, 1929 – November 4, 2022) was an American professional golfer who is best known for winning the 1958 PGA Championship. He won 11 Tour titles between 1955 and 1963, played on four Ryder Cup teams, and served as non-playing captain for the 1977 U.S. Ryder Cup team.

Early life and amateur career
Finsterwald was born and raised in Athens, Ohio. He attended Ohio University in his hometown, where he played on the golf team and graduated in the Class of 1952. In 1969, he was inducted into the Ohio University Athletics Hall of Fame joining his father, Russ Finsterwald, who was in the first class of inductees as a football player, and later basketball and football head coach.

Professional career
Finsterwald turned professional in 1951 and won 11 times on the PGA Tour during his career. He finished fifth or better more than 50 times in his career. He played on four Ryder Cup Teams (1957, 1959, 1961, 1963) and was the non-playing captain of the 1977 team. He won the Vardon Trophy in 1957, which is awarded to the tour professional with the lowest scoring average. In 1958, he was honored as PGA Player of the Year. Finsterwald finished in the money in 72 consecutive tournaments – second only to Byron Nelson's 113 consecutive cuts. This record stood for many years until eclipsed by Jack Nicklaus, Hale Irwin and Tiger Woods; however, he is still fifth on the list as of 2019.

The 1958 PGA Championship was held at Llanerch Country Club in Havertown, Pennsylvania. This was the first PGA Championship held after the format was switched from match play to stroke play. Finsterwald finished the tournament with a two-stroke victory over Billy Casper. Four years later, Finsterwald and Gary Player lost the 1962 Masters in a playoff to Arnold Palmer.

Finsterwald was once involved in litigation in which a plaintiff claimed she lost the sight in her right eye as a result of an errant tee shot he hit at the 18th hole at the 1973 Western Open. A jury found Finsterwald not liable; however, Midlothian (Illinois) Country Club's insurers had to pay the woman about $450,000. Finsterwald served as director of golf at The Broadmoor in Colorado Springs, Colorado for 28 years. He simultaneously served as PGA of America vice-president from 1976–1978; and on the USGA Rules of Golf committee from 1979-1981. He was also the Pro Emeritus of the Pikewood National Golf Club, based in Morgantown, West Virginia.

Finsterwald was honored by fellow Ohio native Jack Nicklaus at the 2007 Memorial Tournament in Dublin, Ohio. In 2008, he was inducted into the Colorado Sports Hall of Fame. Finsterwald lived in Orlando, Florida during the winter and Colorado Springs during the summer.

Professional wins (13)

PGA Tour wins (11)

PGA Tour playoff record (2–4)

Other wins (2)
This list may be incomplete
1954 Carolinas Open
1955 British Columbia Open

Major championships

Wins (1)

Results timeline

Note: Finsterwald never played in The Open Championship.

CUT = missed the halfway cut
"T" indicates a tie for a place.

Summary

Most consecutive cuts made – 13 (1955 U.S. Open – 1960 PGA)
Longest streak of top-10s – 3 (twice)

U.S. national team appearances
Professional
Ryder Cup: 1957, 1959 (winners), 1961 (winners), 1963 (winners), 1977 (non-playing captain, winners)

See also
List of men's major championships winning golfers

References

External links

American male golfers
PGA Tour golfers
PGA Tour Champions golfers
Winners of men's major golf championships
Ryder Cup competitors for the United States
Golfers from Ohio
Golfers from Colorado
Golfers from Florida
Ohio Bobcats athletes
People from Athens, Ohio
1929 births
2022 deaths